Tanzania competed at the 2018 Commonwealth Games in the Gold Coast, Australia from April 4 to April 15, 2018.

Table tennis athlete Masoud Mtalaso was the country's flag bearer during the opening ceremony.

Competitors
The following is the list of number of competitors participating at the Games per sport/discipline.

Athletics

Men
Track & road events

Field events

Women
Track & road events

Boxing

Tanzania participated with a team of 4 athletes (4 men).

Men

Swimming

Tanzania participated with 2 athletes (1 man and 1 woman).

Table tennis

Tanzania participated with 4 athletes (2 men and 2 women).

Singles

Doubles

See also
Tanzania at the 2018 Summer Youth Olympics

References

Nations at the 2018 Commonwealth Games
Tanzania at the Commonwealth Games
2018 in Tanzanian sport